Oliva scripta, common name the Caribbean olive, is a species of sea snail, a marine gastropod mollusk in the family Olividae, the olives.

Description
The length of the shell varies between 25 mm and 60 mm

Distribution
Trawled by shrimpers working tropical Western Atlantic continental shelf areas.
Also known from traps set at depths of 120 metres, offshore West coast Barbados, Lesser Antilles.

This species occurs in the Caribbean Sea, the Gulf of Mexico; off Colombia and Brazil.

References

 Petuch E.J. & Sargent D.M. (1986). Atlas of the living olive shells of the world. xv + 253 pp., 39 pls.
 Rosenberg, G.; Moretzsohn, F.; García, E. F. (2009). Gastropoda (Mollusca) of the Gulf of Mexico, Pp. 579–699 in: Felder, D.L. and D.K. Camp (eds.), Gulf of Mexico–Origins, Waters, and Biota. Texas A&M Press, College Station, Texas.

External links
 Lamarck (J.B.M.de). (1811). Suite de la détermination des espèces de Mollusques testacés. Annales du Muséum National d'Histoire Naturelle. 16: 300-328

scripta
Gastropods described in 1811